The 1840 Rhode Island gubernatorial election was held on April 15, 1840.

Incumbent Whig acting Governor Samuel Ward King won election in his own right, defeating Democratic nominee Thomas F. Carpenter.

General election

Candidates
Thomas F. Carpenter, Democratic, attorney
Samuel Ward King, Whig, acting Governor

Results

Notes

References

1840
Rhode Island
Gubernatorial